Kamil Łączyński (born 17 April 1989) is a Polish basketball player for Anwil Włocławek of the Polish Basketball League. Standing at 1.83 m (6 ft 0 in), he usually plays as point guard.

Career
Łączyński started his career in 2005, with Polonia Warszawa. In the following years, he would play for AZS Koszalin, Rosa Radom and Kutno.

On 4 June 2018, Łączyński won his first PLK title with Włocławek, after defeating Stal Ostrów Wielkopolski 65–73 in Game 6 of the finals. He was named the PLK Finals MVP after averaging 10.8 points and 4.8 assists over the six games in the series. 

On August 22, 2019, he signed with Śląsk Wrocław of the Polish Basketball League. Łączyński averaged 10.3 points and 6.4 assists per game. On September 2, 2020, he signed with Start Lublin.

On June 10, 2021, he has signed a 2-year contract with Anwil Włocławek for his return to club after 2 years.

References

1989 births
Living people
AZS Koszalin players
Basketball players from Warsaw
KK Włocławek players
KKK MOSiR Krosno players
KKS Pro-Basket Kutno players
Point guards
Polish men's basketball players
Polonia Warszawa (basketball) players
Rosa Radom players
Śląsk Wrocław basketball players
Start Lublin players